Cochylimorpha asiana is a species of moth of the family Tortricidae. It is found in China (Beijing, Gansu, Hebei, Heilongjiang, Ningxia, Qinghai, Shaanxi, Shandong), Afghanistan, Iran, Mongolia, Ukraine, Russia, Kyrgyzstan, Turkmenistan, Kazakhstan and Libya.

The wingspan is 17–21 mm. Adults have been recorded on wing from April to July.

References

 
 

A
Moths of Asia
Moths of Africa
Moths described in 1899